Marcos Antonio Amaro dos Santos (born 25 September 1957 in Motuca) is a Brazilian Army general and current Chief of the Brazilian Army General Staff, replacing General Walter Souza Braga Netto.

Military career
He started his military career on 4 March 1974, at the Brazilian Army Preparatory School for Cadets (EsPCEx). Was promoted to Major on 31 August 1993. Reached to the last post in the military as Army General on 31 March 2018.

Amaro already occupied the post of Chief of the Military House of the Presidency between 2 October 2015 and 12 May 2016. Other posts were as Army's Secretary of Economy and Finance as well the Southeastern Military Region command between 3 July 2019 and 28 April 2020.

References

|-

1957 births
Living people
Brazilian generals